Capax Infiniti, or Capax Infiniti (Holding the Infinite), is a 2014 mural by South African artist Faith47, painted on the side of the Carlyle Building, located at 1114 Southwest Washington Street, in downtown Portland, Oregon, in the United States.

Description
The mural depicts a slightly disheveled woman looking away from the viewer, and wringing her hands behind her back. The artist said of the work that "I want it to look like it’s been there for a long time. I enjoy working with things that are slightly ghostly. It’s like existing in two spaces at once."

History
The painting was funded by the Public Art Murals Program and private donors, and is administered by the Regional Arts & Culture Council. The project was facilitated by the nonprofit mural project Forest for the Trees.

The mural is expected to remain visible despite construction of Eleven West, according to The Oregonian.

Reception
Marta Yousif of the Daily Vanguard included Capax Infiniti in her 2019 list of "Top 10 Most Instagrammable Murals in Portland". Parade Kristin Luna said the mural was Oregon's best in her 2019 overview, "Murals Across America: The Very Best Street Art in Every State".

See also
 2014 in art

References

External links

 
 
 
 
 Art Dept: Capax Infinity at Arstlandia

2010s murals
2014 establishments in Oregon
2014 paintings
Murals in Oregon
Paintings in Portland, Oregon
Paintings of people
Southwest Portland, Oregon
Works by South African people